Word Twisters' Adventures (Traditional Chinese: 鐵咀銀牙) is a TVB costume comedy series broadcast in November 2007.

Synopsis
In a Qing Dynasty, the most difficult thing for an articulate legal expert is not to win a lawsuit but to bargain for a twit of fate. Plagued by a mysterious family curse, Chan Mung-Kat (Jordan Chan), who comes from a legal family, is forced by his mother to fool around and devotes all his time to running a brothel despite his great talent. As a result of a careless mistake, he is embroiled in a legal dispute, through which he gets to know the eloquent Lap Lan Ching-Ching (Charmaine Sheh), though Lap Lan Ching-Ching was the only reason for the legal dispute and he knew her before, and the government opponent Fong Tong-Kan (Michael Tse). Kat has developed a strong hatred towards Ching and Kaan since being innocently accused.

Ching’s articulation has not only won her a legal gown bestowed by the Qianlong Emperor but also an arranged marriage (But this was not the emperor's will. It was part of Wo Shen's evil plan to ruin Fong Tong-Kan. Wo Shen had told the emperor that he would arrange a marriage for Lap Lan Ching-Ching and Fong Tong-Kan, but instead chose the most disgusting man in the city, Chan Mung-Kat). Despite her love for Kan, Ching cannot decline the Emperor’s offer and finally agrees to marry Kat. The lovelorn Kan lingers at the brothel day and night, leading himself to get caught up in a murder. Ching tries to save Kan but in vain. Luckily Kat offers to help and manages to pull Kan out of the trouble. Ching has got a different impression of Kat and the incident has once again reminded Kat of the curse and the potential danger of getting involved in any kinds of lawsuits. Kat gets framed later on and Ching is left to deal with the case all on her own. To everyone’s surprise, the curse has now been shifted on to Kat

Cast

Viewership ratings

Awards and nominations
41st TVB Anniversary Awards (2008)
 "Best Drama"
 "My Favourite Female Character" (Charmaine Sheh - Lap Lan Ching-Ching)

References

External links 
TVB.com Word Twisters' Adventures - Official Website 

TVB dramas
2007 Hong Kong television series debuts
2007 Hong Kong television series endings